Jamie Hartman (born 1971) is an English songwriter and producer based in Nashville, Tennessee, and the former lead singer of the indie-pop band Ben's Brother.

Early life
Hartman was born and raised in London.

Career

Ben's Brother
Hartman formed and was the lead singer of the band Ben's Brother, so named because he has an older brother named Ben. Their debut album Beta Male Fairytales, released on EMI Records in 2007, went gold in the UK and reached number 14 on the UK Albums Chart. The single "Let Me Out" earned Hartman a nomination for the Ivor Novello Award for Best Song.

In 2009, the band released their second album, Battling Giants, which reached number 56 on the UK Albums Chart. That album's first single, "Apologise", was co-written with Natalie Imbruglia, and released by Island Records. The album also includes appearances by Jason Mraz and Joss Stone.

Songwriting
Hartman co-wrote the 2016 single "Human" by Rag'n'Bone Man, which reached number 1 on 20 charts in 16 countries. He wrote "All You Good Friends", the debut single for The Voice UK 2016  winner Kevin Simm; co-wrote "All I Need to Know" by Emma Bunton; wrote and produced "Stargazing" by Kygo; co-wrote "Giant" by Calvin Harris and Rag'n'Bone Man; which was nominated for a Brit Award in 2020 for Best Song.  Jamie was also a producer on Conrad Sewell's debut EP All I Know, co-writing the single "Start Again", which won the 2015 ARIA Award for Song of the Year.

Hartman co-wrote and co-produced the Backstreet Boys single "Don't Go Breaking My Heart" with Stuart Crichton and Stephen Wrabel. They won a BMI Award for writing the song, which was nominated for the 2019 Grammy Award for Best Pop Duo/Group Performance. He wrote two songs, including the single "Hold Me While You Wait", on Lewis Capaldi's 2019 album Divinely Uninspired to a Hellish Extent, which was the top album on the UK Albums Chart for the years 2019 and 2020. He wrote and produced nine songs on Celeste's 2021 album Not Your Muse, which reached number 1 on the UK Albums Chart.

He has also written for Christina Aguilera, Jennifer Hudson, Andy Grammer, James Bay, Kylie Minogue, Anastacia, The Wanted, JP Cooper, Miriam Bryant, Will Young and Louis Tomlinson.

Awards

Discography

With Ben's Brother

Songwriting and production credits

References

External links
 Jamie Hartman on AllMusic

Living people
1971 births
British record producers
British songwriters
Singers from London